Norval Morrisseau  (March 14, 1932 – December 4, 2007), also known as Copper Thunderbird, was an Indigenous Canadian artist from the Bingwi Neyaashi Anishinaabek First Nation. He is widely regarded as the grandfather of contemporary Indigenous art in Canada. Known as the "Picasso of the North," Morrisseau created works depicting the legends of his people, the cultural and political tensions between native Canadian and European traditions, his existential struggles, and his deep spirituality and mysticism. His style is characterized by thick black outlines and bright colors. He founded the Woodlands School of Canadian art and was a prominent member of the “Indian Group of Seven."

Biography 
An Anishinaabe, Morrisseau was born March 14, 1932, on the Sand Point Ojibwe reserve near Beardmore, Ontario. His full name is Jean-Baptiste Norman Henry Morrisseau, but he signs his work using the Cree syllabics writing ᐅᓵᐚᐱᐦᑯᐱᓀᐦᓯ (Ozaawaabiko-binesi, unpointed: ᐅᓴᐘᐱᑯᐱᓀᓯ, "Copper/Brass [Thunder]Bird"), as his pen-name for his Anishnaabe name ᒥᐢᒁᐱᐦᐠ ᐊᓂᒥᐦᑮ (Miskwaabik Animikii, unpointed: ᒥᐢᑿᐱᐠ ᐊᓂᒥᑭ, "Copper Thunderbird").

In accordance with Anishnaabe tradition, he was raised by his maternal grandparents with little connection to his actual parents. His grandfather, Moses Potan Nanakonagos, a traditional Medicine Man and Knowledge Keeper, taught him the traditions and legends of his people. His grandmother, Grace Theresa Potan Nanakonagos, was a devout Catholic and from her he learned the tenets of Christianity. The contrast between these two religious traditions became an important factor in his intellectual and artistic development.

At the age of six, Morrisseau was sent to a Catholic residential school, St. Joseph’s Indian Residential School in Fort William, Ontario. There, he and other students were educated in the European tradition, native culture was suppressed, and the use of native language was forbidden. After two years he returned home and started attending a local community school in Beardmore. Morrisseau left the school when he was ten, preferring to learn from elders rather than continuing his formal education. He spent much of his time listening to elders, drawing, fishing, hunting, picking berries, and trapping.

At the age of 19, he became very sick. He was taken to a doctor but his health kept deteriorating. Fearing for his life, his mother called a medicine-woman who performed a renaming ceremony: she gave him the new name Copper Thunderbird. According to Anishnaabe tradition, giving a powerful name to a dying person can give them new energy and save their lives. Morrisseau recovered after the ceremony and from then on always signed his works with his new name.

When he started painting, he was discouraged from sharing traditional stories and images outside of the First Nation, but he decided to break this taboo.

Morrisseau contracted tuberculosis in 1956 and was sent to Fort William Sanatorium to recover.  There he met his future wife Harriet Kakegamic with whom he had seven children, Victoria, Michael, Peter, David, Lisa, Eugene, and Christian.

After being invited by Ontario Provincial Police Constable, Robert Sheppard, to meet the artist, the anthropologist Selwyn Dewdney became an early advocate of Morrisseau's and was very interested in Morrisseau's deep knowledge of native culture and myth. Dewdney was the first to take his art to a wider public.

Jack Pollock, a Toronto art dealer, helped expose Morrisseau's art to a wider audience in the 1960s. The two initially met in 1962 while Pollock was teaching a painting workshop in Beardmore.  As Pollock did not drive, Susan Ross whom Morrisseau had met in 1961  and Sheila Burnford drove Pollock to visit Morrisseau at his home to view more of his works. Struck by the genius of Morrisseau's art, he immediately organized an exhibition of his work at his Toronto gallery. One of Morrisseau's early commissions was for a large mural in the Indians of Canada Pavilion at Expo 67, a revolutionary exhibit voicing the dissatisfaction of the First Nations People of Canada with their social and political situation.

In 1972, Morrisseau was caught in a hotel fire in Vancouver and suffered serious burns. On that occasion, he had a vision of Jesus encouraging him to be a role model through his art. He converted to the apostolic faith and started introducing Christian themes in his art. A year later he was arrested for drunk and disorderly behaviour and was incarcerated for his own protection. He was assigned an extra cell as a studio and was allowed to attend a nearby church.

Morrisseau was the founder of a Canadian-originated school of art called Woodland or sometimes Legend or Medicine painting. His work was influential on a group of younger Ojibwe and Cree artists, such as Blake Debassige, Benjamin Chee Chee, and Leland Bell. His influence on the Woodland school of artists was recognized in 1984 by the Art Gallery of Ontario exhibit Norval Morrisseau and the Emergence of the Image Makers. He spent his youth in remote isolation in northern Ontario, near Thunder Bay, where his artistic style developed without the usual influences of other artists' imagery. As the sole originator of his "Woodland" style he became an inspiration to three generations of artists.

In 1978, Morrisseau was made a Member of the Order of Canada. He was a member of the Royal Canadian Academy of Arts.

As Morrisseau's health began to decline as a result of Parkinson's disease and a stroke in 1994, he was cared for by his adopted family of Gabe and Michelle Vadas. In 2005 and 2006, the National Gallery of Canada in Ottawa organized a retrospective of his work. This was the first time that the Gallery dedicated a solo exposition to a native artist. In the final months of his life, the artist used a wheelchair and lived in a residence in Nanaimo, British Columbia. He was unable to paint due to his poor health. He died of cardiac arrest—complications arising from Parkinson's disease on December 4, 2007 in Toronto General Hospital. He was buried after a private ceremony in Northern Ontario next to the grave of his former wife, Harriet, on Anishinaabe land.

The National Arts Centre, urban ink co-production, Copper Thunderbird, premiered on the Aboriginal Peoples Television Network (APTN) on Monday, February 4, 2008.  Norval Morrisseau was honoured with a posthumous Lifetime Achievement Award during the NAAF Awards show in 2008.

Style 

Morrisseau was a self-taught artist. He developed his own techniques and artistic vocabulary that captured ancient legends and images that came to him in visions or dreams. He was originally criticized by the native community because his images disclosed traditional spiritual knowledge. Initially he painted on any material that he could find, especially birchbark, and also moose hide. Dewdney encouraged him to use earth-tone colors and traditional material, which he thought were appropriate to Morrisseau's native style.

The subjects of his art in the early period were myths and traditions of the Anishnaabe people. He is acknowledged to have initiated the Woodland School of native art, where images similar to the petroglyphs of the Great Lakes region were now captured in paintings and prints. Morrisseau was also inspired by sacred Anishinaabe birch bark scroll images.

His later style changed: he used more standard material and the colors became progressively brighter, eventually obtaining a neon-like brilliance. The themes also moved from traditional myth to depicting his own personal struggles. He also produced art depicting Christian subjects: during his incarceration, he attended a local church where he was struck by the beauty of the images on stained-glass windows. Some of his paintings, like Indian Jesus Christ, imitate that style and represent characters from the Bible with native features. After he joined the new age religion Eckankar in 1976, he started representing on canvas its mystical beliefs.

Morrisseau, who was bisexual, also produced erotic works featuring sexuality between male figures and between male and female figures. Most of these works are now held in private collections. Other works explored Indigenous conceptions of gender fluidity, such as his massive work Androgyny (1983), which was formerly exhibited at Rideau Hall.

The cover art for the Bruce Cockburn album Dancing in the Dragon's Jaws is a painting by Norval Morrisseau.

Fakes and forgeries 

The prevalence of fakes and forgeries was of deep concern to Morrisseau, particularly during his later years, and he actively sought to remove these from the marketplace.

In 2005, Morrisseau established the Norval Morrisseau Heritage Society (NMHS). The Society is currently compiling a database of Norval Morrisseau paintings to discredit many prevalent Morrisseau forgeries. This committee, not affiliated with any commercial gallery or art dealer, comprises highly respected members of the academic, legal and Aboriginal communities working on a volunteer basis. It is charged with creating a complete catalogue raisonné of Norval Morrisseau artwork. The NMHS is currently researching Morrisseau art, provenance and materials and techniques in order to complete the task assigned to them by the artist. The NMHS continue their work and in 2008, were in Red Lake, Ontario to research additional information and art by the artist.

The Art Dealers Association of Canada (ADAC) issued the following directive in the Winter 2007 newsletter to their membership: "The Art Dealers Association of Canada is enacting a rule and regulation that no certificates of authenticity will be issued by any members of ADAC with respect to any works or purported works by Norval Morrisseau and that the Norval Morrisseau Heritage Society is the sole authority for the authentication of works by Norval Morrisseau." ADAC also revoked the membership of a dealer who failed to comply with this directive.

Morrisseau also engaged in more direct intervention, identifying fake and forged works available for sale, particularly those purported to be painted by him in the so-called "70s style". He wrote to galleries and made sworn declarations identifying items being sold as "fakes and imitations". More than ten sworn declarations  were directed to at least seven dealers and galleries during 1993–2007, requesting that fake and forged works be removed or destroyed. These dealers were the Artworld of Sherway, Gallery Sunami, Maslak McLeod Gallery, Bearclaw Gallery, Gary Bruce Thacky (AKA Gary Lamont of Thunder Bay, Ontario) and Randy Potter Estate Auctions.

Building on Morrisseau’s efforts, for the last 20 years, the battle to stop the proliferation of fakes has waged. Lawyers, doctors, Morrisseau’s friends, apprentice and estate, as well as leading native art scholars, government workers and many others, including musician Kevin Hearn of the Barenaked Ladies, have tried to help in Morrisseau’s battle by exposing the existence of a fraud ring manufacturing fake Morrisseau paintings. The 2019 documentary film There Are No Fakes, directed by Jamie Kastner, helped to bring this issue into the public view. Recently in 2019, after hearing testimony from people inside the fraud ring itself, the Ontario Superior and Appeal courts recognized the existence of that fraud. The courts also found that the Maslak-McLeod Gallery, a vendor of works attributed to Morrisseau, had acted fraudulently.:

“The (previous lower court) trial judge erred in failing to find that the Gallery’s provision of a valid provenance statement was a term of the purchase and a warranty, not mere puffery,” the new appeal decision states.
Mr. McLeod’s assertion that the painting was genuine was only matched by his elusiveness in demonstrating that fact, which can only be explained as deliberate,” said the appeal panel. “With respect to the provenance statement, Mr. McLeod made a false representation, either knowing that it was false and without an honest belief in its truth, or he made the statement recklessly without caring whether it was true or false, with the intent that Mr. Hearn would rely upon it, which he did, to his personal loss.”
Gallery owner Joseph McLeod is no longer alive; McLeod’s estate has been ordered to pay Hearn $50,000 for breach of contract and breach of the Sale of Goods Act, plus punitive damages of $10,000."

The debate concerning the authenticity of the "70s paintings" commonly found in the marketplace, continues with ongoing litigation.

Law enforcement have launched an active investigation into the Norval Morrisseau art fraud as confirmed by the National Post:

"However, police in Thunder Bay say they have now launched a criminal investigation into a possible art fraud ring involving Morrisseau paintings. Spokesman Scott Paradis said Friday investigators are “not prepared to speak about potential suspects or persons of interest.” "The criminal investigation is one of several major developments to take place after what’s shown in the film, which ends with the outcome of the lawsuit."

On March 3, 2023 the Thunder Bay Police and Ontario Provincial Police announced they had pressed charges against 8 people and seized over 1000 paintings in the forgery cases. Police described it as "the biggest art fraud in world history."

Solo exhibitions 

1961 Hughes Gallery,  London, Ontario  
1962, 1963, 1964 Pollock Gallery, Toronto
1965 Hart House Gallery at University of Toronto
1965 Galerie Godard Lefort, Montreal
1966 Musée du Québec (now renamed Musée National des Beaux-Arts du Québec), Quebec City
1966 Galerie Cartier (Co-sponsored by Pollock Gallery), Montreal
1968 Art Gallery of Newport (Sponsored by Galerie Cartier), Newport, Rhode Island
1969 Galerie St-Paul, St-Paul de Vence, France 
1972 Pollock Gallery, Toronto
1974 Canadian Guild of Crafts, Toronto
1974 The Bau-Xi Gallery, Vancouver
1974 Pollock Gallery, Toronto
1975 Pollock Gallery, Toronto
1975 Shayne Gallery, Montreal
1976 Pollock Gallery, Toronto
1976 Gallery 115, Winnipeg
1977 Pollock Gallery, Toronto
1977 Graphic Gallery, Vancouver
1978 Wells Gallery, Ottawa
1978 First Canadian Place (sponsored by the Pollock Gallery), Toronto
1979 Pollock Gallery, Toronto
1979 The Gallery Stratford, Stratford, Ontario 
1979 Shayne Gallery, Montreal
1979 The McMichael Canadian Collection (Artist in residence), Kleinburg, Ontario 
1979 Cardigan/Milne Gallery, Winnipeg
1980 Canadian Galleries, Edmonton
1980 Lynnwood Arts Centre, Simcoe, Ontario 
1980 Bayard Gallery, New York 
1981 Pollock Gallery, Toronto
1981 Anthony's Gallery, Toronto
1981 Anthony's Gallery, Vancouver
1981 Thunder Bay National Exhibition Centre, Thunder Bay, Ontario 
1981 Nexus Art Gallery, Toronto
1982 Moore Gallery, Hamilton, Ontario 
1982 Masters Gallery, Calgary
1982 Robertson Gallery, Ottawa
1982 The New Man Gallery, London, Ontario 
1982 Nexus Art Gallery, Toronto
1982 Legacy Art Gallery, Toronto
1982 Scarborough Public Gallery, Scarborough, Ontario 
1984 Ontario Place, Toronto
1984 Ontario North Now, Kenora, Ontario 
1985 Norman Mackenzie Art Gallery, Regina, Saskatchewan 
1986 First Canadian Place (joint exhibition with Brian Marion), Toronto
1986 Manulife Centre, Edmonton
1987 Gulf Canada Gallery, Edmonton
1988 Sinclair Centre, Vancouver
1989 The Art Emporium, Vancouver
1990 Kinsman Robinson Galleries, Toronto 
1991 Kinsman Robinson Galleries, Toronto
1991 Wallack Gallery, Ottawa, Ontario 
1992 Jenkins Showler Galleries, White Rock, British Columbia 
1994 Kinsman Robinson Galleries, Toronto
1997 Kinsman Robinson Galleries, Toronto
1999 Kinsman Robinson Galleries, Toronto
1999 The Drawing Centre, New York
2001 Art Gallery of South Western Manitoba, Brandon, Manitoba 
2001 Canada House Gallery, Banff, Alberta 
2001 Drawing Center, New York
2002 Thunder Bay Art Gallery, Thunder Bay, Ontario 
2006 Steffich Fine Art, Salt Spring Island, British Columbia 
2006 National Gallery of Canada, Ottawa
2006 Thunder Bay Art Gallery, Thunder Bay, Ontario 
2006 McMichael Canadian Art Collection, Kleinburg, Ontario 
2006 Kinsman Robinson Galleries, Toronto
2007 Institute of American Indian Arts Museum, Santa Fe, New Mexico 
2007 The George Gustav Heye Center of the National Museum of the American Indian, New York

See also
Notable Indigenous people of Canada
Indian Group of Seven

References

Further reading 
Norval Morrisseau, Legends of my People, The Great Ojibway, McGraw-Hill Ryerson, Toronto, 1977, 
 Jack Pollock, Lister Sinclair, "The Art of Norval Morrisseau", Methuen & Co., USA, 1979, .
 Norval Morrisseau, Donald C. Robinson, Travels to the House of Invention, Key Porter Books Ltd, Canada, 1997, .
 Basil H. Johnston, The Art of Norval Morrisseau, The Writings of Basil H. Johnston, The Glenbow Museum, Calgary, 1999.
 Norval Morrisseau, Donald C. Robinson, Return to the House of Invention, Key Porter Books Ltd, Canada, 2005, .
 Greg Hill, Norval Morrisseau: Shaman Artist, Douglas & McIntyre, Canada, 2006, .
 Marie Clements, "Copper Thunderbird", Talonbooks, Canada, 2007, .
 
 Robertson, Carmen. Norval Morrisseau: Life & Work. Toronto: Art Canada Institute, 2016.

External links 
 Norval Morrisseau Legal
 Boston Globe Obituary: Norval Morrisseau, was native artist of Canada
 Canadian Encyclopedia
Life and Work by Carmen Robertson (Art Canada Institute)
 There Are No Fakes: A Documentary by Jamie Kastner
Paul and Mary Okanski fonds at the National Gallery of Canada, Ottawa, Ontario
Nancy Robinson Villarroel fonds at the National Gallery of Canada, Ottawa, Ontario

1932 births
2007 deaths
Deaths from Parkinson's disease
Neurological disease deaths in Ontario
Members of the Order of Canada
Ojibwe people
People from Thunder Bay District
First Nations painters
Artists from Ontario
Members of the Royal Canadian Academy of Arts
20th-century First Nations painters
Woodlands style
Indspire Awards
Canadian LGBT painters
LGBT First Nations people
Canadian male painters
20th-century Canadian LGBT people
20th-century Canadian male artists